Neochaetoplagia is a genus of parasitic flies in the family Tachinidae. There is one described species in Neochaetoplagia, N. pastranai.

Distribution
Argentina, Chile.

References

Diptera of South America
Dexiinae
Taxa named by Émile Blanchard
Tachinidae genera
Monotypic Brachycera genera